The Victoria Falls Field Museum is a museum located along the Zambezi River in Victoria Falls, Zambia. It has displays relating to the history of the region, and to the formation of the falls.

References
Museums in Zambia
 Location of Victoria Falls Field Museum on Openstreetmap

Museums in Zambia
Victoria Falls